Mekrania is a genus of moths of the family Erebidae. The genus was erected by Wilhelm Brandt in 1941.

The Global Lepidoptera Names Index gives this name as a synonym of Megarenia Hampson.

Species
Mekrania obliqualis Wiltshire, 1982 Saudi Arabia
Mekrania punctalis Brandt, 1941 Iran

References

Hypeninae